3x3D is a 2013 anthology film comprising three short 3D films directed by French/Swiss filmmaker Jean-Luc Godard, British filmmaker Peter Greenaway and Portuguese filmmaker Edgar Pêra. It was released in France April 30, 2014 after being presented at the closing night of International Critics' Week of the 2013 Cannes Film Festival in May. It also screened at the 2013 Vancouver International Film Festival.

The film was commissioned by the city of Guimarães in Portugal at the time of its designation as European Capital of Culture in 2012.

Segments
 Just in time directed by Peter Greenaway 
 Cinesapiens directed by Edgar Pêra 
 Les Trois Désastres directed by Jean-Luc Godard

Cast

Just in Time
Miguel Monteiro as Gil Vicente, Pope John XXI, Bishop Barbosa and The Wineman

Cinesapiens
Carolina Amaral
Keith Davis
Leonor Keil
Ângela Marques
Nuno Melo
Jorge Prendas
Pedro J. Ribeiro

Critical reception
Film critic Serge Kaganski called Peter Greenaway's short film technically ruffling but cinematically zero. Jean-Michel Frodon praised Jean-Luc Godard's film, calling it virtuoso and innovative. Peter Debruge called it "little more than a vanity commission to celebrate the EU selecting Guimaraes, Portugal, as its European Capital of Culture for 2012."

References

External links
 
 3X3D at AlloCiné

2013 films
2013 3D films
2010s English-language films
French anthology films
2010s French-language films
Portuguese drama films
2010s Portuguese-language films
Films directed by Jean-Luc Godard
Films directed by Peter Greenaway
2013 short films
2013 multilingual films
French drama films
2010s British films
2010s French films